The Kuria people (also known as the AbaKurya, are a Bantu community in Tarime District of Mara Region in Tanzania and southern Kenya. Their homeland is bounded on the east by the Migori River and on the west by the Mara River estuary. Traditionally a pastoral and farming community, the Kuria grow maize, beans and cassava as food crops and coffee and maize as cash crops.

Overview 
The homeland of the Kuria is between the Migori River on the east and the Mara River estuary on the west, extending from Migori County in Kenya on the east to Musoma Rural District in Tanzania on the west. On the south, their land borders Transmara District in Kenya and the Nguruimi area of Tanzania. On the north is Lake Victoria, with a small corridor occupied by the Luo and other Bantu peoples.

The Kuria are found in Kenya and Tanzania. In Kenya, they live in the Kuria East (headquartered in Kegonga) and Kuria West districts (headquartered in Kehancha). In Tanzania, they live in Serengeti and Tarime Districts, Musoma Urban and Rural Districts, and Bunda District. The Kuria have recently settled in Tanzania's Mara Region.

Their neighbours are the Maasai, Kalenjin (the Kipsigis in western Transmara), Ikoma, Luo and Suba. The Kuria are divided into several clans, which live in Kenya and in Tanzania. In Kenya, there are four clans: the Abagumbe, Abairege, Abanyabasi and Abakira. Tanzania has 13 (the Abapemba, Ababurati, Abakira, Abamera, Simbete, Abanyabasi, Watobori, Abakunta, Wiga, Kaboye, Abakenye, Abagumbe and Wasweta, Abatimbaru), in addition to other minor clans.

The Kuria are traditionally a farming community, primarily planting maize, beans and cassava as food crops. Cash crops include coffee and maize. The Kuria also keep cattle.

Etymology, demographics and history
The name "Kuria" seems to have been applied to the whole group by early colonial chiefs, mainly to distinguish them from the other Luo peoples along the southern shore of Lake Victoria (who were known as Abasuba). According to major Kuria clan tradition (including the Abanyabasi, Abatimbaru, Abanyamongo, Abakira, Abairegi, Abakenye, Abanchaari, and Abagumbe), their ancestor was Mokurya. His descendants migrated from Misiri, and after many years of wandering along Lake Victoria they reached present-day Bukurya. According to this tradition, the Kuria have been divided into two families: the Abasai (from Mokurya's elder wife) and the Abachuma, from his younger wife.

In another view of the name's origin, between 1774 and 1858 Kuria people lived on Korea Hill (north of the Mara River in the Musoma district of present-day Tanzania). The region's inhabitants became known as "Korea people" after the hill, which evolved into "Kuria hill". During the colonial period, the Kenyan Kuria called themselves Abatende (after the Abatende clan in the Bugumbe region); the Tanzanian Kuria continued to be known by their totems. Around the 1950s, the name Kuria gained wide usage. Mijikenda, Abaluyia and Kalenjin also became generally accepted as ethnic names during the 1940s and 1950s, when they sought political recognition from Kenyan colonial authorities.

The Kuria people may not have a common origin, although a number of clans claim to have come from Egypt. Kurian culture is an amalgam of several heterogenous cultures. Among the Kuria are people who were originally from the Kalenjin-, Maasai-, Bantu- and Luo-speaking communities. Between AD 1400 and 1800, during migrations into Bukurya, the foundation was laid for Kuria cultural and political development. Early inhabitants of Bukurya were Bantu and Nilotic speakers, who brought their distinct cultures; the predominantly-agricultural Bantu came into contact with Nilotic pastoralists. This combined agriculture and pastoralism, with nomadic tendencies. Kuria agriculture resembles that of the Abagusii and Luo, and their cattle-keeping has borrowed practices from the Maasai, Zanaki and Nguruimi.

Before the mass mobilization during the Ugandan-Tanzanian War (1978-1979), though the Kuria were only about 1% of Tanzania's population, they made up over 50% of its soldiers (then-President Julius Nyerere was from that tribe). Following the power and plunder of war, their postwar return to comparatively humble civilian life—heavily armed—led to crime, inter-communal violence, and power shifts. In particular, it exacerbated the widespread, longstanding Kuria tradition of cattle thefts and raids, which, in modern times, has expanded into widespread, intense, organized and commercial criminal activity—and concurrent vigilantism.

The 2006 Kuria population was estimated at 909,000, with 608,000 living in Tanzania and 301,000 in Kenya. Anthropological research in 2012 estimated the population of the Kuria in Kenya at about 650,000, and the Tanzanian population at about 700,000.

The Kuria people were primarily pastoralists during the pre-colonial era. The Kenyan Kuria lean towards crop production, and the Tanzanian Kuria tend towards pastoralism.

Culturally, the Kuria people practice circumcision for both male and female until today considering modern practices.

Tools

Names

Common words

Kuria is related to the Gusii language.

References

External links

Kurya language on Ethnologue

Ethnic groups in Kenya
Ethnic groups in Tanzania